Bijapura may refer to:

 Bijapur, a city in Karnataka, India
 Bijapura, Bhopal, a village in Bhopal, India